The Home Nations Series is a snooker tournament series in the four home nations of the United Kingdom. It began in the 2016–17 snooker season, combining two existing tournaments, the Scottish Open and Welsh Open, with two newly created tournaments, the English Open and Northern Ireland Open.

History 
On 29 April 2015, Barry Hearn, chairman of World Snooker announced that from the 2016–17 snooker season, a "Home Nations Series" would be added to the season's calendar. The Home Nations Series includes the tournaments of the four individual countries of the home of snooker, the English Open, the Northern Ireland Open, the Scottish Open, and the Welsh Open. A player who wins all four tournaments in the same season receives a special bonus of £1 million. So far, the highest number of tournaments won in the same season is two, with Mark Selby winning the English and the Scottish Open in the 2019–20 season, and Judd Trump winning the English and the Northern Ireland Open in the 2020–21 season. The Home Nations Series awards two wildcards to amateur players. The four national governing bodies select the wildcard players according to criteria that they have previously agreed with the WPBSA.

The first round of the Home Nations was changed for the 2021-22 season, whereby the first round is now a qualification round for all players not in the top 16. However, the top 16 would play their qualification round at the venue instead of elsewhere.

Events and trophies 
The cups of the individual tournaments are named after well-known snooker players of the respective countries:
 At the English Open: after Steve Davis, the Davis Trophy
 At the Northern Ireland Open: after Alex Higgins, the Higgins Trophy 
 At the Scottish Open: after Stephen Hendry, the Hendry Trophy
 At the Welsh Open: after Ray Reardon, the Reardon Trophy

Format 
All tournaments are ranking tournaments of the World Snooker Tour and are played with 128 players. After first nominating all professional players, the wildcard players will be nominated and finally top-up players from the Q School order of merit. Up to and including the last 16, the matches are played as best-of-seven frames, in the quarter-finals as best-of-nine, semi-finals as best-of-eleven frames, and in the final best-of-seventeen. As of the 2021-22 season, the last 128 round has been changed to a qualifying round, where players outside of the top 16 have to win a match in order to play at the final venue. The top 16 still play in the qualifying round, however, their matches are held over to be played at the final venue.

Results

Statistics

Champions

References

 
Snooker competitions in the United Kingdom

Snooker tours and series